Cedar Creek Gallery is a fine craft gallery located in Creedmoor, North Carolina. Craftspeople work alongside each other, fire wood and gas fired kilns, blow glass and make a living as artists onsite. Cedar Creek Pottery and Gallery was started in 1968 by Sid and Pat Oakley on what used to be an old tobacco field. The Gallery has grown from one building into over ten since then. The grounds are well maintained with many plants, flowers and trees.

History
Sid and Pat Oakley purchased a plot of land in Northside, North Carolina (now part of Creedmoor). They affectionately called it "Strawberry Fields" and would often get visitors asking for the fruit. They used the property to make pottery and sold it on site. Eventually, the little shelter where they sold their wares gave way to a larger and larger space. Sid and Pat invited other craftspeople to work alongside them.

A book was written about Sid Oakley, entitled A Simple Life: A Story of Sid Oakley by Kathy Norcross Watts. Sid Oakley had his pottery commissioned by the Smithsonian. In 1989, Sid was named a North Carolina Living Treasure.

Awards
Winner of the North Carolina Governor's Award for Excellence 
Cedar Creek Gallery presents the Award of Excellence to an craftsperson each year at the Carolina Designer Craftsmen Guild, as the mark of excellent work deserving of special recognition.

Shows
 Cedar Creek Gallery is home to the nationally-recognized triennial National Teapot Show.
 Spring Festival (formerly Spring Kiln Opening)
 Fall Festival (formerly Fall Kiln Opening)
The annual Spring and Fall festivals are the longest continually running outdoor festivals in North Carolina. The Spring Festival runs the first two weekends in April. The Fall Festival runs the first two weekends in October. There are craft demonstrations by glass, wood, pottery, jewelry, metalwork and fabric artisans. Work made during the festival is available for sale, right out of the pottery and glass kilns. Live music and food is also served.

 Art of the State (tm) - Periodic craft showcase of North Carolina artists

Resident artists
In addition to a gallery of work for sale, several artisans collaborate and work onsite.
The resident artists are:    
 Lisa Oakley - furnace blown glass
 Brad Tucker - earthenware pottery
 John Martin - pottery, lamps 
 Jennifer Stas - pottery
 Matt Decker - furnace blown glass
 Harrison Harper - furnace blown glass
 Pringle Teetor - furnace blown glass
 Dana Smith - furnace blown glass
 Will Kurylo - furnace blown glass
 Alan Bennett - pottery, fish
 Pat Oakley - pottery
 Sid Oakley [deceased] - pottery, painting, mosaics
   
Pringle Teetor, Dana Smith and Will Kurylo are part of the 4WindsStudio located at CCG

Former resident artists
 Blaine Avery apprenticed under Sid Oakley and rented studio space from 1991 until 2002
 Jennifer Mecca worked as Gallery Manager and began her craft career in 1991.
 Tim Turner - worked and lived on site from 2009 to 2012. Pottery
 Sandra McEwen - Cloisonné & Champlevé Enamel Jewelry

Other
The Museum of American Pottery is located onsite in a climate controlled room off the main Gallery floor.

Sources
 News and Observer, Scott Huler, October 22, 1996, Glass Act: The first glass blowing studio in the Triangle features creative shapes, but Lisa Oakley says that doesn't make her an artist
 News and Observer, Kathy Watts, September 28, 2003, Potter's Daughter See the Light

References

Art museums and galleries in North Carolina
Art festivals in the United States
Buildings and structures in Granville County, North Carolina